Dagfinn Grønoset (April 4, 1920 – January 28, 2008) was a journalist and writer born in Trysil, Norway, and living in Elverum most of his life. He is known for his books about wilderness and people living off the beaten track. His literary debut was Vandring i villmark from 1952. Anna i Ødemarka from 1972 became one of the biggest commercial successes for Norwegian publishing houses, and is later translated into fourteen languages, issued in seventeen countries.

Personal life
Grønoset was born in Tynset. a son of farmer and forest owner Daniel Grønoset and Minda Augusta Skogli. In 1957 he married journalist .

Career
Grønoset started working for the Elverum based newspaper Østlendingen at the age of 19, and was assigned with the newspaper until 1974, when he became a full-time author.

He made his literary debut in 1952, with the book Vandring i villmark, based on his own hiking experiences in the Femund district. Further books are Finnskog og trollskap (1953), a biography of Hallgeir Brenden from 1956, Nitahå-Jussi (1957), Med Kong Olav mot nord (1959), Langs bygdevegen (1960), and I Vinjes fotspor (1960).

His book Folk fra skogene from 1970 reported on people living in the forest districts. Anna i ødemarka from 1972 portrayed one of these people in more detail, as a heroine living a hard life close to nature. The book soon became very popular, and received massive media attention such as full-page newspaper coverage and separate television programs. It has been translated into a total of 17 languages. Similar books are Tater-Milla (1974), Barnet Gud glemte (1979), and Gunhild fra skogene (1982).

He was awarded HM The King's Medal of Merit (gold) in 1980. A bust of Grønoset, sculpted by Skule Waksvik, was erected in Elverum in 1986.

Selected bibliography
Vandring i villmark (1952) Biographic reports from Femundsmarka
Finnskog og trollskap (1953). Also film
Gull i sporet  (1956) Biography of Hallgeir Brenden
Nitahå-Jussi (1957) Biografi of an eccentric from Finnskogen, the "Forest of the Finns"
Med kong Olav mot nord (1959)
Villmarksfolk (1959) Illustrated by Kjell Aukrust
Langs bygdevegen (1960)  With Vidar Sandbeck
I Vinjes fotspor (1960) Travelogue from Sollia and Folldal
Bella Capri (1961)
Folk fra skogene (1970) Short stories
Anna i ødemarka (1972)
Tater-Milla (1974)
Barnet Gud glemte (1979)
Femundsmarka (1979) With Ragnar Frislid og Per Hohle
Gunnhild fra skogene (1982)
Furer i fedrelandet (1984).  Illustrated by Kjell Aukrust
Kvinner på veg og vidde (1986)
Villmark og vinløv (1988)  Illustrated by Kjell Aukrust and others
Det rotfaste folket (1990) Illustrated by Kjell Aukrust and others
Hurra for livet (1991)
Viser ved vegen (1994)

References

1920 births
2008 deaths
20th-century Norwegian novelists
Norwegian male short story writers
Norwegian songwriters
Norwegian nature writers
Norwegian travel writers
Norwegian biographers
Male biographers
People from Trysil
People from Tynset
People from Elverum
Recipients of the King's Medal of Merit in gold
20th-century biographers
Norwegian male novelists
20th-century Norwegian short story writers
20th-century Norwegian male writers
20th-century Norwegian journalists